Love Island is a British dating game show. It is a revival of the earlier celebrity series of the same name, which aired for two series in 2005 and 2006. The series is the originator of the international Love Island franchise, with twenty-two versions of it having been produced so far worldwide. The show is presented by Maya Jama and narrated by Iain Stirling. The show was previously hosted by both Caroline Flack and Laura Whitmore.

The show has been highly successful and influential in British popular culture; it became ITV2's most watched show in the network's history in 2018, and as of 2020 was the most watched TV show among its target audience of 16- to 34-year-olds. However, it has attracted a considerable amount of controversy, with four people linked to the show having died by suicide. Contestants Sophie Gradon and Mike Thalassitis died by suicide after appearing on the programme; Gradon's boyfriend died by suicide about 20 days after her death. The following year the show's original presenter, Caroline Flack, also died by suicide. There have been calls from some to cancel the programme.

History

On 13 February 2015, it was confirmed that Love Island would be returning, and would be aired on ITV2. However this series would include members of the public rather than celebrities. On 18 April 2015, it was announced that Caroline Flack would be hosting the show. The series finally returned on 7 June 2015 with a live special showing the new Islanders enter the villa. During the series, a number of guests entered the villa including Calum Best, who was one of the Islanders in the original series back in 2005, and went on to win the series. Mark Wright also made a guest appearance in this series DJing for Lauren Richardson's birthday party. The series ended on 15 July 2015 and was won by Jess Hayes and Max Morley. Islanders Cally Jane Beech and Luis Morrison became the first couple from the show to have a baby together.

The second series was confirmed on 14 February 2016, and began airing on 30 May 2016. This series featured the first Islander to be removed from the villa. Malia Arkian only spent a matter of hours in the villa before she was removed from the series by the producers after an altercation with Kady McDermott. It also included a number of Islanders who decided to voluntarily leave the villa, the first being Rykard Jenkins.

Also during the series, Islander Zara Holland was stripped of her Miss Great Britain title due to her behaviour in the villa. The second series also included Sophie Gradon and Katie Salmon becoming the first same-sex couple on the show. The series was eventually won by Cara De La Hoyde and Nathan Massey on 11 July 2016. On 15 September 2018, the series runners-up Olivia Buckland and Alex Bowen married, becoming the first couple from Love Island to marry.

The third series was confirmed on 14 February 2017, and began airing on 5 June 2017. This series was the first series to include a second villa, which was brought into the series during a twist set to put the couples to the ultimate test. This series also featured dumped Islanders Mike Thalassitis and Sam Gowland returning to the villa after being voted back in by the public; a first for the show.
The series ended on 24 July 2017 and was won by Amber Davies and Kem Cetinay. During the final Aftersun episode of the series, which was presented live from outside the villa, it was announced that there would be a one-off reunion special airing on 30 July 2017 which included all of the Islanders from the series.

The fourth series began on 4 June 2018, and launched with a record 4,050,000 viewers making it the most watched multichannel TV programme since the 2012 Summer Olympics were broadcast on BBC Three, and the most watched ever on ITV2. The series included the reintroduction of "Casa Amor" following its success in the previous series. The series concluded on 30 July 2018 and was won by Dani Dyer and Jack Fincham, who received a record-breaking 79.66% of the final vote.

It was also confirmed that another one-off reunion special would air a week after the final. As the fourth series began, the Islanders experienced tragedy with the suicides of Gradon and her boyfriend Aaron Armstrong, as well as the suicide of Thalassitis months after the series concluded.  After the latter's death, the programme announced that they would offer counselling to all contestants in hopes of preventing further suicides.

A fifth series was confirmed on 30 July 2018, which started broadcasting on 3 June 2019. The series increased upon the previous success of the fourth, gaining a record-breaking 4,700,000 viewers on TV sets and a further 1,400,000 viewers on other devices for the episode following Casa Amor, the most for any ITV2 broadcast. Furthermore, more than half of the viewers were in the 16 to 34 age bracket. The series concluded on 29 July 2019 and was won by Amber Gill and Greg O'Shea with a 48.82% share of the vote.

On 24 July 2019, ITV announced that two series of Love Island would air in 2020 – one in the winter and another in the traditional summer slot. The winter series would be broadcast in January 2020 from a new villa in South Africa. On 17 December 2019, Flack announced that she would be standing down as host for the sixth series following allegations of assault towards her boyfriend, Lewis Burton. On 20 December, it was announced that fellow TV presenter Laura Whitmore would be standing in as the new host.

On 15 February 2020, Flack was found dead in her London home, prompting ITV to pull two episodes from airing out of respect for the former host at the weekend. Series 6 continued from 17 February and Iain Stirling, the show's narrator, paid tribute to Flack saying he was devastated by the loss of his "true friend". Sponsorship adverts for fast-food company Just Eat were replaced by a message telling people to be kind, with a contact number for the Samaritans.

On 4 May 2020, Love Island announced the cancellation of the summer 2020 show due to the COVID-19 pandemic. Kevin Lygo, ITV's Director of Television said in a statement: "We have tried every which way to make Love Island this summer but logistically it's just not possible to produce it in a way that safeguards the wellbeing of everyone involved and that for us is the priority. In normal circumstances we would be preparing very soon to travel out to the location in Mallorca to get the villa ready but clearly that's now out of the question." It was later confirmed that the show would not be airing a winter version of the series in 2021 due to uncertainties regarding the pandemic and international travel. On 4 March 2021, ITV confirmed that Love Island would return in the summer after an 18-month hiatus. An eighth series was announced at the end of series seven in August 2021 and began airing the following summer on 6 June 2022.  Also in June 2022, ITV announced that two series would air in 2023, with one airing in the New Year in South Africa and the second returning to Mallorca in its usual summer slot. On 22 August, Whitmore announced that she would not be returning to host the show's ninth series in January 2023. On 12 October 2022, ITV2 announced that Maya Jama would be taking over from Whitmore as Love Island host.

Format
Love Island involves a group of contestants, referred to as Islanders, living in isolation from the outside world in a villa in Mallorca, constantly under video surveillance. To survive in the villa the Islanders must be coupled up with another Islander, whether it be for love, friendship, or money, and the overall winning couple receives a combined £50,000. On the first day, the Islanders couple up for the first time based on first impressions, but over the duration of the series they are forced to "re-couple" where they can choose to remain in their current couple or swap partners.

Any Islander who remains single after the re-coupling is eliminated and dumped from the island. Islanders can also be eliminated via public vote, as during the series the public votes through the Love Island app available on smartphones for their favourite couple or prospective couple. Pairs who receive the fewest votes risk being eliminated. Often a twist has occurred where it has been up to the Islanders to vote one of their own off the island. During the final week, the public vote towards which couple they want to win the series and therefore take home £50,000.

During the first series, the Thursday episode was presented live by Caroline Flack where eliminations often took place and new Islanders entered the villa. However, from the second series onwards the live episodes were axed except for the final. Whilst in the villa, each Islander has their own phone in which they can only contact other Islanders via text – or receive texts informing them of the latest challenges, dumpings or recouplings. Islanders and couples are typically faced with many games and challenges to take part in designed to test their physical and mental ability, with the winners getting special prizes afterwards. Some Islanders are also sent on dates outside the villa, or can win dates by winning challenges.

Spin-offs
From the first series, a weekly re-cap episode entitled Love Island: The Weekly Hot List aired every Saturday and includes a round-up of everything that has happened in the villa over the past week. This also includes unseen footage. In May 2017 it was confirmed that a new spin-off show Love Island: Aftersun would air during the third series. It airs live on Sundays after the highlights episode and is hosted by main show host Maya Jama. It also includes celebrity guests, former Islanders and a studio audience. On 30 July 2017, Love Island: The Reunion was broadcast on ITV2, interviewing the islanders and remembering the most memorable moments from the third series.

On 1 and 2 October 2017, Chris Hughes and Kem Cetinay starred in their own spin-off show, Chris & Kem: Straight Outta Love Island, which followed the popular double act as they write a rap song to perform at a Ministry of Sound club night. The two-part series also starred Chris and Kem's girlfriends from Love Island, Olivia Attwood and Amber Davies. It was broadcast on ITV2. In March 2018, a fly-on-the-wall documentary spin-off titled Chris and Olivia: Crackin’ On was aired and followed the life about contestants; Chris Hughes and Olivia Attwood after Love Island and their dramatic split. Unlike the other spin-offs and the main show, it was broadcast on ITVBe.

Ahead of the fourth series in 2018, it was revealed that Kem Cetinay would be returning alongside Arielle Free to present Love Island: The Morning After, a new daily podcast show delivering the freshest gossip to fans.

The fifth series was the first not to include The Weekly Hotlist; instead it was replaced by Love Island: Unseen Bits.

Tommy Fury and Curtis Pritchard starred in The Boxer & The Ballroom Dancer in December 2019, which saw the pair step out of their comfort zones as they swapped jobs.

Ekin-Su Cülcüloğlu and Davide Sanclimenti starred in Ekin-Su and Davide: Homecomings in November 2022. Following their Series 8 win, the new couple embarked on two trips of a lifetime to Davide's beloved Italy and Ekin-Su's hometown in Turkey.

Locations

Summer series: Mallorca
The main Mallorcan villa for the UK version of Love Island is Sa Vinyassa in Sant Llorenç des Cardassar, Casa Amor is the nearby Alchemy Villa, and the Vibe Club is the Shiva Beach Club in Llucmajor.

Between 2017 and 2021, the main villa was Diseminado Poligono 5 near Sant Llorenç des Cardassar.

Winter series: South Africa
The South African villa for the 2020 series was Midden Cottage in the Constantia suburb of Cape Town.

Future locations
In June 2022, ITV confirmed that there will be "2 helpings" of Love Island in 2023.  It will return in January at a "stunning new villa in South Africa," before returning to Mallorca for an 8-week run in the summer.

Series overview

Timeline of Hosts

Contestants

Controversies

Harassment 
Some contestants have had revenge porn containing explicit images of them posted online and have received death threats.

Mental health concerns 
Concerns of mental health impacts of Love Island participants has been noted following the deaths of original host, Caroline Flack and contestants Sophie Gradon and Mike Thalassitis all within 20 month period by suicide. Gradon's boyfriend also died by suicide about 20 days after her death.  After the suicides of Gradon and Thalassitis, concerns were raised about the pressures of reality television. Before her death, Gradon had spoken of the attacks she had received from online trolls as a result of appearing on the programme. Ian Hamilton, a senior lecturer at the University of York on addiction and mental health, described the program as one that "thrives on manufacturing conflict" and that "unfortunately it's the contestants who bear the brunt of this".

After Flack's death in February 2020, there were calls from some to cancel the programme. Questions were raised about the pressures of the show, and many drew attention to how The Jeremy Kyle Show had recently been cancelled after the suicide of a participant. In response, producers of the show provided training on handling negativity, financial management, and social media.

Reception 

In 2018, Love Island received the BAFTA TV Award for the 'Best Reality and Constructed Factual' category. The writer George Gillett has suggested that the show's success is a consequence of allowing viewers to explore taboos around dating and relationships through shared, communal, vicarious experience.

Complaints 
The show has received numerous complaints, with 4,100 people lodging official complaints about the 2018 series over issues such as the footage aired and how contestants have treated one another. The charity Women's Aid has criticised the treatment of female contestants by "controlling" and "abusive" male contestants. The Mental Health Foundation charity has also criticised the show for the negative impact it can have on viewers who feel insecure about their bodies. The show has also received criticism for its lack of body and ethnic diversity. The show's producers responded to this criticism by stating that the show was "aspirational" and that they "make no excuses" about having a cast of 'attractive' people on the show.

Merchandise 
Love Island Pool Party compilation albums have been released by Ministry of Sound since 2018. A Love Island app was released in 2017 by ITV Studios Global Entertainment, and Love Island: The Game was released in 2018 by Fusebox Games. It was reported by the Evening Standard in May 2020 that 12 million people globally had played the game.

References

External links
 
 

 
2015 British television series debuts
2010s British reality television series
2020s British reality television series
British dating and relationship reality television series
British television series revived after cancellation
English-language television shows
ITV reality television shows
Mallorca
Television series by ITV Studios
Television shows filmed in Spain
Television shows set in Spain